Ogibalovo is a rural locality (a village) in Tiginskoye Rural Settlement, Vozhegodsky District, Vologda Oblast, Russia. The population was 97 as of 2002.

Geography 
Ogibalovo is located 39 km northwest of Vozhega (the district's administrative centre) by road. Kurshiyevskaya is the nearest rural locality.

References 

Rural localities in Vozhegodsky District